Coconino Reservoir is located near Flagstaff in North Central Arizona and is just half mile south of Ashurst Lake. Recreational facilities are maintained under the authority of the Coconino National Forest.

Fish species
 Rainbow Trout
 Northern Pike

References

External links
 Arizona Boating Locations Facilities Map
 Arizona Fishing Locations Map
 Video of Coconino Reservoir
 Chapter 6c Lower Little Colorado River Sub-Watershed.pdf

Reservoirs in Coconino County, Arizona
Coconino National Forest
Reservoirs in Arizona